Maralyn Lois Polak is an American columnist, screenwriter, performance poet, spoken word artist, novelist and journalist.

Career
In collaboration with architect Benjamin Nia, Polak co-created the 25-minute documentary My Hometown: Preservation or Development? about the threatened demolition of 19th century buildings near Philadelphia's historic Rittenhouse Square, and preservationists' efforts to save them from a developer's wrecking ball.

Her journalistic career also includes a long stint with the mainstream media as nationally syndicated weekly celebrity interview columnist for Knight Ridder and the now-defunct Sunday Magazine of The Philadelphia Inquirer, where she did over a thousand columns.

Polak was a commentary columnist for the online news site WorldNetDaily.
 	
Polak authored the experimental online meta-novel, IMAGINARY PLAYMATES/Man in Her Mind: Further Adventures of Boris and Natasha, serialized weekly for six months on the former political-literary website FemmeSoul.Com, and a cartoon book, Anoushka on Her Deathbed: 101 Cartoons From the Abyss.
 	
Polak's reviews, essays and opinion editorials have appeared in the Chicago Tribune and The New York Times.

References

External links 

Miranda Pear’s Brazen Bedtime Stories: Un-P.C. Fairytales for Grownups

Year of birth missing (living people)
American columnists
21st-century American novelists
American political writers
American documentary filmmakers
Jewish American writers
Jewish women writers
Screenwriters from New Jersey
Knight Ridder
Living people
Novelists from New Jersey
American women poets
American women columnists
American women novelists
20th-century American women writers
21st-century American women writers
21st-century American poets
20th-century American poets
20th-century American non-fiction writers
21st-century American non-fiction writers
American women documentary filmmakers
21st-century American Jews